Heringen (also: Heringen/Helme in order to distinguish from Heringen in Hesse) is a town in the district of Nordhausen, in Thuringia, Germany. It is situated on the small river Helme, 8 km southeast of Nordhausen.

Sons and daughters of the town
 Hermann Hendrich (1854-1931), painter

References

Nordhausen (district)